A protocrystalline phase is a distinct phase occurring during crystal growth, which evolves into a microcrystalline form. The term is typically associated with silicon films in optical applications such as solar cells.

Applications

Silicon solar cells 
Amorphous silicon (a-Si) is a popular solar cell material owing to its low cost and ease of production. Owing to disordered structure (Urbach tail), its absorption extends to the energies below the band gap resulting in a wide-range spectral response; however, it has a relatively low solar cell efficiency. Protocrystalline Si (pc-Si:H) also has a relatively low absorption near the band gap, owing to its more ordered crystalline structure. Thus, protocrystalline and amorphous silicon can be combined in a tandem solar cell, where the top thin layer of a-Si:H absorbs short-wavelength light whereas the longer wavelengths are absorbed by the underlying protocrystalline silicon layer.

See also 
Amorphous silicon
Crystallite
Multijunction
Polycarbonate (PC)
Polyethylene terephthalate (PET)

References

External links 
 

Crystallography
Thin-film cells